Eogeometer is a prehistoric genus of Ennomine geometer moths in the tribe Boarmiini. Both the genus and species were described by Thilo C. Fischer, Artur Michalski and Axel Hausmann in 2019 as the first geometrid caterpillar in Baltic amber.

References

Eogeometer
Boarmiini
Moth genera